UFC 123: Rampage vs. Machida was a mixed martial arts event held by the Ultimate Fighting Championship on November 20, 2010 at the Palace of Auburn Hills in Auburn Hills, Michigan. It was the first UFC event in the Metro Detroit area since UFC 9.

Background

A private ceremony was hosted an hour before the start of the card, where José Aldo was awarded the inaugural UFC Featherweight Championship belt by Dana White. Fans in the building were not permitted to view the ceremony.

UFC 123 featured preliminary fights live on Spike TV.

On October 13, Rory MacDonald had to withdraw from his fight against Matt Brown. He was replaced by Brian Foster.

Gabe Ruediger was scheduled to face Paul Kelly, but was forced off the card with a groin injury on October 25. T.J. O'Brien replaced Ruediger.

Darren Elkins withdrew from his matchup with promotional newcomer Edson Barboza and was replaced by Mike Lullo.

Results

Bonus awards
Fighters were awarded $80,000 bonuses.

Fight of the Night: George Sotiropoulos vs. Joe Lauzon
Knockout of the Night: B.J. Penn
Submission of the Night: Phil Davis

Controversy
A formal complaint was filed with Michigan's Unarmed Combat Commission regarding the timekeeping of the Harris-Falcão match.  Near the end of the first round, Falcão was choking Harris.  The allegation is that the timekeeper ended the round six seconds early and in turn had the round not ended early, Falcão may have successfully choked out Harris.  Despite Falcão ultimately winning the fight by decision, the formal complaint was filed on January 13, 2011.

References

See also
 Ultimate Fighting Championship
 List of UFC champions
 List of UFC events
 2010 in UFC

Ultimate Fighting Championship events
2010 in mixed martial arts
Mixed martial arts in Michigan
Sports competitions in Detroit
2010 in sports in Michigan